Look is a French sports equipment manufacturing company based in Nevers that has led the innovation of alpine skiing quick-release binding systems. The company later moved into cycling with innovations in clipless pedals and carbon fiber frames. The Look logo was inspired by Piet Mondrian paintings.

History 

In 1948, engineer and inventor Jean Beyl, who owned a rubber manufacturing company, broke his leg skiing whilst wearing a rigid ski binding, which then brought him into the fledgling safety binding business. In 1950, Beyl invented the Look Nevada dual-pivot ski binding system. The following year the Look company was founded, named after the American magazine Look. The 1962 Look Nevada II single-pivot ski binding design was the main influence for the company's bindings over the next 40 years.

Following Beyl's early designs of a clipless bicycle pedal, in 1983, Look was bought by French businessman Bernard Tapie, who created the professional cycling team La Vie Claire the following year. The first clipless pedals released by Look were the PP65. With the La Vie Claire team, Bernard Hinault won the 1985 Tour de France using PP65 pedals, helping secure the acceptance of clipless pedal systems which remains in widespread use today. At the 1986 Tour, Greg LeMond rode a "Bernard Hinault" Signature Model Look prototype for his win of the race. Look's pedal designs have been a source of inspiration for rival manufacturers ever since.

Look started manufacturing carbon bike frames in the late-1980s. In June 2016, Activa Capital became a majority shareholder in the company, together with Dominique Bergin and Thierry Fournier.

Sponsorships
Second-tier Continental cycling team Fortuneo-Oscaro rode Look bikes from 2015 to 2018. As of 2019, Look Cycle is sponsoring team Nippo–Delko–One Provence.

Bibliography

References

External links 

 
 Look Bindings

Ski equipment manufacturers
Cycle manufacturers of France
Cycle parts manufacturers
Manufacturing companies established in 1951
French companies established in 1951
French brands
Companies based in Bourgogne-Franche-Comté